Ely is an unincorporated community in Marion County, in the U.S. state of Missouri.

History
Ely had its start in the late 1850s when the railroad was extended to that point. The community was named for Dr. Ezra Stiles Ely, a reverend from Pennsylvania. A post office called Ely Station was established in 1874, the name was changed to Ely in 1883, and the post office closed in 1937.

References

Unincorporated communities in Missouri
Unincorporated communities in Marion County, Missouri